Cong Peiwu (born May 1967) is a Chinese diplomat serving as Chinese Ambassador to Canada .

Biography
Cong once served as counsellor of the Chinese Embassy in Britain. In 2014, he became head of the Department of North American and Oceanian Affairs of the Ministry of Foreign Affairs of the People's Republic of China, replacing Xie Feng. On September 5, 2019, Geng Shuang confirmed that Cong would serve as Chinese Ambassador to Canada.

Career

Ambassador to Canada
On 15 October 2020, during an online press conference, Cong said "So if the Canadian side really cares about the stability and prosperity in Hong Kong, and really cares about the good health and safety of those 300,000 Canadian passport holders in Hong Kong, and the large number of Canadian companies operating in Hong Kong SAR, you should support those efforts to fight violent crimes." Asked if this was a threat to Canadians, he replied "That is your interpretation."

On 24 September 2021, Cong accompanied Huawei's deputy chairwoman and its chief financial officer, Meng Wanzhou to Vancouver International Airport to send her off aboard her repatriation flight back to Shenzhen, Guangdong, China, after over 1000 days under house arrest.

On 3 February 2023, Cong was summoned by officials of Global Affairs Canada amidst an incident of a balloon of Chinese origin crossing into Canadian and United States airspace eventually traversing the whole contiguous United States.

References

1967 births
Living people
China Foreign Affairs University alumni
Ambassadors of China to Canada
Chinese Communist Party politicians
Diplomats of the People's Republic of China